NGC 337 is a barred spiral galaxy in the constellation Cetus. It was discovered on September 10, 1785 by William Herschel. It was described by Dreyer as "pretty faint, large, extended, gradually a little brighter middle, 10th magnitude star 21 seconds of time to the east."

Supernova
NGC 337 had hosted one supernova, SN 2014cx.

References

External links
 

0337
17850910
Cetus (constellation)
Barred spiral galaxies
Discoveries by William Herschel
003572